Reveille was a popular British weekly tabloid newspaper founded by Reg Hipwell during the Second World War and the post-war years.

Launched on 25 May 1940, it was originally the official newspaper of the Ex-Services' Allied Association. It was bought by the Mirror Group in 1947, after which it was printed and published by IPC Newspapers Ltd.

In the 1950s it increased its light-entertainment pages and would often run features on the Royalty.

During the 1960s and 1970s it became known as Reveille Magazine and would publish large double-page pop posters and also feature glamour models.

Author Rosemary Timperley wrote a great many articles for Reveille under her own name and pseudonyms. The crime fiction writer Michael Gilbert published a number of short stories in Reveille, some of them featuring his series character Inspector Petrella.

In March 1973 it was renamed New Reveille, the title being reverted to Reveille in March 1975. By the end of 1975 Reveille had shrunk from its previous 40 page size and had dropped the short story feature, becoming more concerned with television, films, and celebrities.

Its last issue appeared on 17 August 1979 and in September 1979 it merged with Tit-Bits magazine.

Trivia
1954: 19 February issue featured Marilyn Monroe
1957: John Lennon bought one of his first guitars after seeing it advertised in Reveille magazine.
1959: Reveille front page, headlined "Hay there!", with a woman in hay, filmed full screen on a London newsstand in the autumn of 1958 by Robert Vas, a Hungarian refugee and film director in the making, for "Refuge England", at 22'21 of 25'15, part of Free Cinema 6, 'The Last Free Cinema', which premiered at the National Film Theatre from 1822 March 1959.
1963: The paper featured in the film Doctor in Distress when actor Harry Landis is seen reading a copy in a greasy spoon cafe, including the headline "How I Ran Away to Fame by Frank Ifield".

References

 Richard, Simms (2008). Articles in Reveille. Rosemary Timperley. Retrieved 22 January 2008.

1940 establishments in the United Kingdom
1979 disestablishments in the United Kingdom
Weekly newspapers published in the United Kingdom
Defunct newspapers published in the United Kingdom
Newspapers established in 1940
Defunct weekly newspapers
Publications disestablished in 1979
Newspapers published in London